Samuel Luis Chapanga, better known simply as Campira (born April 9, 1982 in Maputo) is a Mozambican international football defender playing for Maxaquene.

Career
Campira has become one of the regular players in the right side of the defence of the Mozambique national football team over the years, gaining a total of 13 caps by December 2009. At club level he has played most of his career in the historical Clube de Desportos do Maxaquene with short spells at Grupo Desportivo da Companhia Têxtil do Punguè (2003–2004) and another historic, Clube de Desportos da Costa do Sol (2006). He also had some unsuccessful experiencies abroad, where he failed to adapt, namely at Russian FC Lokomotiv Moscow (2004–2005) and Croatian NK Dinamo Zagreb (2005–2006).

References

External sources
 

Living people
1982 births
Mozambican footballers
Mozambique international footballers
Association football defenders
GD da Companhia Têxtil do Punguè players
GNK Dinamo Zagreb players
CD Costa do Sol players
C.D. Maxaquene players
Liga Desportiva de Maputo players
UD Songo players
Vilankulo F.C. players
FC Lokomotiv Moscow players
2010 Africa Cup of Nations players
Mozambican expatriate footballers
Expatriate footballers in Croatia
Expatriate footballers in Russia
Sportspeople from Maputo